Tuc del Caubo is a mountain of Catalonia, Spain. Located in the Serra de Costuix, Pyrenees, it has an elevation of 2,570 metres above sea level.

See also
Mountains of Catalonia

References

Mountains of Catalonia
Mountains of the Pyrenees